Márton Lorentz (born 1 February 1995) is a Hungarian professional footballer who plays for Paks II.

Club career
On 14 February 2022, Lorentz returned to Siófok on loan until the end of the season.

Club statistics

Updated to games played as of 15 May 2021.

References

External links
 MLSZ 
 

1995 births
Living people
Footballers from Budapest
Hungarian footballers
Hungary youth international footballers
Association football defenders
Fehérvár FC players
Puskás Akadémia FC players
Dunaújváros PASE players
BFC Siófok players
Paksi FC players
Nemzeti Bajnokság I players
Nemzeti Bajnokság II players
Nemzeti Bajnokság III players